The acoustic radiations or auditory radiations are structures found in the brain, in the ventral cochlear pathway, a part of the auditory system. 
Acoustic radiation arising in the medial geniculate nucleus and end in primary auditory cortex (transverse temporal gyri).
Lesions to the auditory radiations could be a cause of cortical deafness.

References

Auditory system
Thalamic connections
Cerebral white matter